St Anthony-in-Meneage is a coastal civil parish and village in Cornwall, England, United Kingdom. The parish is in the Meneage district of the Lizard peninsula. In the 2001 census the parish had a population of 171, decreasing to 168 at the 2011 census.

Geography
It largely consists of a church, the former vicarage, a farmhouse, and various converted farm buildings now used as holiday accommodation. The peninsula ends at Dennis Head, the site of an early Celtic fortress. Later it served as a Royalist stronghold during the Civil War, and provided a lookout point for the Home Guard during the Second World War.

The parish is divided by the tidal Gillan Creek. The hamlet and parish church are on the north side of the creek. On the south side are the hamlets of Carne, Flushing (not to be confused with the larger village of Flushing north of Falmouth) and Gillan, and further inland the small ancient settlements of Boden and Trewarnevas.

The South West Coast Path runs along both shores of Gillan Creek and crosses it on stepping stones only passable at low tide. The path then rounds Dennis Head and leaves the parish on the south shore of the Helford River. St Anthony-in-Meneage lies within the Cornwall Area of Outstanding Natural Beauty (AONB).

Parish church
The parish church is dedicated to St Anthony and is close to the shore. It is medieval though parts are of other dates: a window in the chancel (Early English) is the earliest and the north aisle with an arcade of plain octagonal piers somewhat later. The tower was built in the 15th century of granite blocks at the west end. The font is ornamented with angels and a Latin inscription and is probably of the 15th century.

Bosahan

Bosahan House was a 19th-century country estate with a large house, which was demolished in 1884 and rebuilt on a grander scale. The Member of Parliament for West Cornwall, Arthur Pendarves Vivian MP bought the estate at an auction (reserve price £24,000) in 1882, when the estate was described as having a "fine residential mansion". Also included in the sale were the three farms of Halvose, Passage and Treath (about ) as well as some fishing and ferry rights on the River Hal. At the time of the auction the estate covered  in the parishes of St Anthony, Manaccan and Constantine, and was originally developed by the Grylls family. The 1884 house was demolished in the 1950s and replaced by a smaller house. In 1909, The Gardeners' magazine described the garden which had been developed over the previous 25 years, as "the most Cornish of all Cornish gardens". Bosahan Garden is sometimes open to visitors.

References

External links

 Cornwall Record Office Online Catalogue for St Anthony in Meneage
 Cornwall Online Parish Clerks website (accessed 2010-09-14)

Civil parishes in Cornwall
Meneage
Villages in Cornwall